Revenge of the Worthless is a 2016 Pakistani action drama film featuring the directorial debut of Jamal Shah with an assistant direction of Zohaib Akhtar and produced by Amna Shah under production banner Hunerkada Films. The film casts Jamal Shah himself, Ayub Khoso, Firdous Jamal, Shamil Khan, Maira Khan and Emel Karakose along with new talent, the students of Hunerkada College of Visual and Performing Arts. And Noor Bukhari in a Cameo.

Plot outline 
The film depicts a brutally disfigured cultural narrative of a land with the enviable cultural heritage highlighting the heroic struggle of a few unsung heroes during 2009 Swat Insurgency.

Jamal Shah plays the lead, Zarak Khan, whose wife and two daughters refuse to leave their ancestral home. They decide to fight the invaders, along with their household staff. Tragedy leads to the end of Zarak Khan, three servants, and one daughter.

Cast 
 Jamal Shah as Zarak Khan
 Firdous Jamal as Maulana Sufi Mohummed 
 Ayub Khoso as Ameer Qudratuullah
 Imran Tareen as Janan Khan 
 Shamil Khan as Arbaz Khan
 Maira Khan as Shabana
 Noor Bukhari in Cameo
 Emil Karakose as Palwasha
 Iftikhar Qaiser as Ustad
 Asfandyar Khan as Taliban
 Qumber Ali as Taliban
 Saad Farukh Khan as Arab Doctor.
 Bilal Khattak as Masoom Khan
 Abdul Rahim Langove as Gulalai
 Iram Rehman as Zarlashta
 Kaleem Achakzai as Ismael
 Asif Shah as Kareem Kaka
 Agha Mustafa Hassan as Sher Khan
 Zubair Achakzai as Commander Mansoor
 Qazi Zubair as Malik Qahar Khan
 Meheryar Khan as Taliban

Marketing 
First look title poster was revealed on 26 November 2015 and teaser trailer on 15 January 2016. Theatrical trailer and poster was revealed on 5 April 2016. Final look poster and theatrical trailer was released on 15 January 2016.

Release 
Firstly, the film was scheduled to release on 22 May 2015 but it was postponed because of Zimbabwe cricket tour to Pakistan after the 6 years ban on Pakistan tours. The director thought it may affect the film business as matches were being held in Lahore, the Lollywood city. 
The film was scheduled for 15 January 2016 release but yet again the film was postponed. The film was passed uncut by CBFC for release on 22 July 2016.

See also 
 List of directorial debuts
 List of Pakistani films of 2016

References

External links 
 

Pakistani action drama films
2016 films
2016 action drama films
Pakistani multilingual films
2010s Urdu-language films
Summit Entertainment films
Pashto-language films
Films about revenge
2016 directorial debut films